Dnipriany is an urban-type settlement in Kakhovka Raion, Kherson Oblast, southern Ukraine. Dnipriany belongs to Nova Kakhovka urban hromada, one of the hromadas of Ukraine. It has a population of

Administrative status 
Until 18 July, 2020, Dnipriany belonged to Nova Kakhovka Municipality. The municipality as an administrative unit was abolished in July 2020 as part of the administrative reform of Ukraine, which reduced the number of raions of Kherson Oblast to five. The area of Nova Kakhovka Municipality was merged into Kakhovka Raion.

Economy

Transportation
The closest railway station, Elektromash, is located in Nova Kakhovka. It is on the railway connecting Mykolaiv via Snihurivka and Nova Kakhovka with Melitopol. There is infrequent passenger traffic.

The settlement has road access to Nova Kakhovka and further to Highway M14 connecting Kherson with Melitopol.

See also
Dnipriany River Port

References

Urban-type settlements in Kakhovka Raion